Aventurine SA is a Greek  independent video game developer and publisher founded in 2003, located in Athens, Greece. They are the developers of Darkfall, a massively multiplayer online role-playing game, also known as Darkfall Online.

History 
In July 2000 Claus Grovdal, Kjetil Helland and Ricki Sickenger founded Razorwax AS in Oslo, Norway for the purpose of making online games. Soon  they were joined by Erik Sperling Johansen and Henning Ludvigsen and in August 2001, they announced the development of Darkfall.

In 2002 the group relocated to join Zad El Mehdawi, Tasos Flambouras and Spiros Iordanis and found Aventurine SA in Athens, Greece, in order to continue developing Darkfall.

Titles

Darkfall 

Darkfall Online is sandbox MMORPG released on February 25, 2009 and was published in North America and Europe. Darkfall Online's servers shut down on November 15, 2012.

Darkfall Unholy Wars 
Darkfall Unholy Wars is the sequel of Darkfall and was released on April 16, 2013 and discontinued in May, 2016.

In June 2012 Aventurine signed a deal with   MGame Corporation, a Korean game publisher and developer, to release the new version of Darkfall to the Asian market.

Technology 

Aventurine's core technology consists of their real-time 3D engine.

Research projects 

Aventurine participates in formal research initiatives in order to benefit from the collaborative research networks supported by European Union Frameworks. Some examples include:

Aventurine received development grants for Darkfall Online by the Hellenic Ministry of Development related to law 3299/2004 (Private Investment for Economic Growth and Regional Convergence)
The project "Development, Marketing and Distribution of the Subscription-Based Online Game Darkfall" was funded by the Information Society under Measure 4.3 "Advanced telecommunications services for the citizen", for the Action "Funding of Enterprises for Implementation of Advanced Broadband Services".
The Hellenic Secretariat of Research and Technology funded Aventurine's research proposal for the design and development of next generation 3D engine technologies.
Partner in a joint research proposal on Virtual Collaborative Environments with the University of Dublin, MIT's MediaLab Europe, Siemens, Fraunhofer-Gesellschaft, and SINTEF Telecom and Informatics, under the EU Sixth Framework Programme's e-Inclusion research initiative.
Partner in a joint research proposal on the development, validation and promotion of a standard file format designed to support the efficient reuse of 3D data. Other partners include the Politecnico di Torino, Samtech Group, GiugaroSPA, CSA Spain, University of Dresden, Octaga, Living Solids, Instituto Technologico de Catilla y Leon. The research was part of the EU's Specific Targeted Research Projects.

References

External links
 Aventurine SA homepage
 Darkfall Unholy Wars
 Aventurine Mini Documentary

Video game companies of Greece
Video game development companies
Video game publishers